John Armine Wodehouse, 5th Earl of Kimberley FRSA (born 15 January 1951), is a British chemist and peer.

Early life
The eldest of four sons of John Wodehouse, 4th Earl of Kimberley, but his only child with his first wife, Carmel Maguire, daughter of Mickey Maguire, welterweight champion of Australia,  
he was educated at Eton College and the University of East Anglia, where he graduated BSc and MSc.

Kimberley's middle name, Armine, recalls his ancestor Sir Armine Wodehouse, 5th Baronet, from whom the writer P. G. Wodehouse was also descended.

Career
Kimberley is a chemist and worked for GlaxoSmithKline from 1974 until he retired in 2012. He is also a computer systems programmer, a Fellow of the British Interplanetary Society, a member of the British Computer Society, and a Fellow of the Royal Society of Arts.

He succeeded his father to the peerages in 2002. In 2008, he was licensed as a lay reader in the Church of England.

Personal life
In 1973, Kimberley married the Hon. Carol Palmer, daughter of Raymond Palmer, 3rd Baron Palmer. They have two children: Lady Katherine Frances Wodehouse and David Simon John Wodehouse, Lord Wodehouse (born 1978), heir apparent to the peerages.

Lady Kimberley is a priest in the Church of England. She was made a canon at St Alban's Abbey in 2010 and is the first and only "Revd Canon Countess" in British history.

References

1951 births
Living people
People educated at Eton College
Alumni of the University of East Anglia
15
John Wodehouse, 5th Earl of Kimberley
Anglican lay readers